Barbour County is the name of two counties in the United States:

 Barbour County, Alabama
 Barbour County, West Virginia